Unborn is the tenth studio album by American death metal band Six Feet Under. The album was released on March 19, 2013.

Unborn features writing credits from guitarist Jari Laine of Torture Killer and features guest guitarist Ben Savage of Whitechapel. It is Six Feet Under's first album to feature bassist Jeff Hughell, the only one to feature guitarist Ola Englund and the last to feature guitarist Steve Swanson, guitarist Rob Arnold and drummer Kevin Talley.  Chris Barnes' nephew Ryley Dipaola performed drums on the vinyl-only bonus track, "Illusions".

Track listing
All lyrics written by Chris Barnes.

Personnel 
Six Feet Under
Chris Barnes − vocals
Steve Swanson − lead guitar
Ola Englund − rhythm guitar
Jeff Hughell − bass
Kevin Talley − drums

Additional musicians
Rob Arnold − guitar on "Inferno" & "Psychosis"
Ben Savage - guitar on "Neuro Osmosis","Decapitate","Fragment" & "The Sinister Craving"
Ryley Dipaola - guitar & drums (vinyl bonus track "Illusions")

Production
Produced by Six Feet Under
Drums recorded by Eyal Levi, Orlando Villasenor and Mark Lewis at Audiohammer Studios
Bass recorded by Zack Ohren at Castle Ultimate Studios
Guitars recorded by Brandon Cagle
Vocals recorded by Chaz Najjar
Mixed & mastered by Chris "Zeuss" Harris at Planet Z Studios

Artwork
Cover art by Dusty Peterson
Layout by Bryan Ames

References

2013 albums
Six Feet Under (band) albums
Metal Blade Records albums